Peyman Qasemkhani (born 20 January 1967) is an Iranian film screenwriter, director and actor.

Early life
He was born on 20 January 1967. He graduated from Ahvaz University in 1985.

Personal life
He was married to Bahareh Rahnama in 1992 and divorced in 2016. Rahnama is an Iranian actress who has been active in Iranian cinema since 1993. They have a daughter, Paria, who was born in 1997. She appeared with her mother in two films, including Bano and Mard-e Hezar-Chehreh. Qasemkhani married Mitra Ebrahimi in 2021. Qasemkhani's brother, Mehrab Qasemkhani is also a writer and his former spouse, Shaghayegh Dehghan is an actress.

Selected filmography

Film
as a writer

as a director

as an actor

Television
as a writer

as a director

Home network 
as a writer

as a director

References

External links

 

1966 births
Living people
Iranian satirists
Iranian screenwriters
Male actors from Tehran
Iranian male film actors
Crystal Simorgh for Best Screenplay winners